The Bentley Historical Library is the campus archive for the University of Michigan and is located on the University of Michigan's North Campus in Ann Arbor. It was established in 1935 by the regents of the University of Michigan. Its mission is to serve as the official archives of the university and to document the history of the state of Michigan, as well as the activities of its people, organizations and voluntary associations.
The library is named after Alvin M. Bentley, a former regent and U.S. Congressman, whose widow, Arvella D. Bentley, endowed the library.

References

External links

Bentley Historical Library Home Page

University of Michigan campus
University and college academic libraries in the United States
1935 establishments in Michigan
Tourist attractions in Ann Arbor, Michigan
Libraries in Michigan
Libraries established in 1935
Special collections libraries in the United States